Theo Pearl George (born 2000 or 2001) is a Motswana footballer who plays as a defender for Wonder Girls and the Botswana women's national team.

Club career
George has played for Wonder Girls in Botswana.

International career
George capped for Botswana at senior level during the 2021 COSAFA Women's Championship and the 2022 Africa Women Cup of Nations qualification.

References

External links

2000s births
Living people
Botswana women's footballers
Women's association football defenders
Botswana women's international footballers